Yousuf Khan ((1929 – 20 September 2009) was one of the Pakistan's most respected actors. He appeared in more than four hundred films in Urdu, Punjabi and Pashto languages over his 46 year long career.

Career
Yousuf Khan made his debut in the Pakistani film Parwaaz in 1954. He started his film career as a supporting actor, but later matured into a lead actor. He started his film career when the Pakistani film industry was ruled by big name actors like Sudhir, Santosh Kumar, Darpan and Aslam Pervaiz. He made a name for himself first as a romantic hero in Urdu language films. Later on, in the late 1970s and 1980s, he became known as an action hero in Punjabi and Pashto language films. He died in Lahore.

Filmography

 Parwaaz (1954) (his debut film)
 Hasrat (1958)
 Laggan (1960)
 Do Raste (1961)
 Susral (1962)
 Khamosh Raho (1964)
 Malangi (1965)
 Maa Baap (1966)
 Imam Din Gohavia (1967)
 Taj Mahal (1968)
 Dil-i-Betaab (1969)
 Babul (1971)
 Gharnata (1971)
 Khoon Da Darya (1973)
 Ziddi (1973)
 Jawab Do (1974)
 Seedha Raasta (1974)
 Khatarnak (1974)
 Khooni (1975)
 Sharif Badmash (1975)
 Chitra Te Shera (1976)
 Phool aur Sholay (1976)
 Warrant (1976)
 Yaar da Sehra (1976)
 Yarana (1976)
 Takrao (1978)
 General Bakht Khan (1979)
 Dushman Dar (1981)
 Rustam Tey Khan (1983)
 Wadda Khan (1984)
 Ghulami (1985)
 Disco Dancer (1987)
 Khuda Gawah (1993)
 Umar Mukhtar (1997)
 Allah Rakha
 Bau Ji
 Bharosa
 Chann Puttar
 Chann Veer
 Chhanga Tay Manga
 Dushman Mera Yaar
 Japani Guddi
 Khan -E- Azam
 Khatarnak
 Nagin
 Qissa Khawani
 Sher Maidaan Da
 Shera
 Sohni Mahiwal
 Tere Ishq Nachaya
 Buddha Gujjar (2002)
 Arrain Da Kharak

Death 
Yousuf Khan died on 20 September 2009 at age 78 at Lahore, Pakistan of cardiac arrest.

Awards and recognition
 Nigar Award for Best Actor in Punjabi language film Ziddi (1973 film)
 Pride of Performance Award in 2004 by the President of Pakistan

See also
 List of Lollywood actors

References

External links
 

1929 births
2009 deaths
People from Firozpur
Male actors from Lahore
Pakistani male film actors
Recipients of the Pride of Performance
Nigar Award winners